Glenn A. Olds (February 28, 1921 – March 11, 2006) was an American academic administrator, government official and politician.  Olds was raised in Oregon and attended Willamette University.
Olds served as the president of Springfield College in western Massachusetts from 1958 to 1965, of Kent State University in Ohio from 1971 to 1977, and of Alaska Pacific University from 1977 to 1988. In 1986, he was the Democratic nominee for U.S. Senate from the state of Alaska, which he lost to incumbent Frank Murkowski.  He also served as commissioner of the Alaska Department of Commerce and Economic Development during the second governorship of Walter Hickel in the early 1990s.

Electoral history
 United States Senate election in Alaska, 1986

Blanket primary results

General election results

References

External links
 Martin Dobrow, "How the FBI Tried to Block Martin Luther King’s Commencement Speech", The Atlantic (June 14, 2014); extensively discussing the biography of Glenn Olds, and his involvement in this event.

1921 births
2006 deaths
20th-century American politicians
Alaska Democrats
Alaska Pacific University faculty
People from Kent, Ohio
People from Sherwood, Oregon
Presidents of Kent State University
Springfield College (Massachusetts)
State cabinet secretaries of Alaska
Willamette University alumni
20th-century American academics